Andarak is a village in Batken Region of Kyrgyzstan. It is part of the Leylek District. The town of Isfana is 9 km to the northeast of Andarak. Its population was 8,001 in 2021.

Population

References

External links 

Satellite map at Maplandia.com

Populated places in Batken Region